Echium hypertropicum is a species of flowering plants of the family Boraginaceae. The species is endemic to Cape Verde. It is listed as an endangered plant by the IUCN.

Its local name is língua-de-vaca (cow tongue), a name that may also refer to the related species Echium vulcanorum and Echium stenosiphon. The oil of its seeds contains γ-linolenic acid, and is used for medicinal and dietary purposes.

Description
The plant can reach 2 m height. Its leaves are lance-shaped and can be up to 20 cm long. Its flowers are whitish, purplish or bluish. Old plants higher than 0.5–1 m are extremely rare today.

Distribution and ecology
Echium hypertropicum occurs on the islands of Santiago and Brava. It mainly occurs in sub-humid and humid zones.

References

Further reading

''The endemic vascular plants of the Cape Verde Islands, W Africa, Sommerfeltia 24, 1997,  C. Brochmann, Ø. H. Rustan, W. Lobin & N. Kilian, ISSN 0800-6865,  

hypertropicum
Endemic flora of Cape Verde
Flora of Santiago, Cape Verde
Flora of Brava, Cape Verde